Hokejsko društvo Hidria Jesenice, commonly referred to as HD Hidria Jesenice, is a Slovenian ice hockey team. In the past the team was known as HK HIT Casino Kranjska Gora and HD Mladi Jesenice. They were a farm team for HK Jesenice until 2012, when HK Jesenice was dissolved. Currently, the team serves as a reserve team for HDD Jesenice. Their home arena is Podmežakla Hall.

Players

NHL alumni
Since its foundation, the club has graduated one player who has played in the NHL.

Anže Kopitar

References

Ice hockey clubs established in 1998
Ice hockey teams in Slovenia
Sport in Jesenice, Jesenice
1998 establishments in Slovenia
Slohokej League teams
Slovenian Ice Hockey League teams
Articles containing video clips